Hühnerwasser is a river of Brandenburg, Germany. It flows into the Spremberg Reservoir, which is drained by the Spree.

See also
List of rivers of Brandenburg

Rivers of Brandenburg
Rivers of Germany